John Glenister (born 12 October 1932) is a retired English television director. His credits included The Six Wives of Henry VIII, Emma, Rumpole of the Bailey, Play for Today, Dennis Potter's 1971 biopic of Casanova, A Touch of Frost, Alan Plater's On Your Way, Riley, Hetty Wainthropp Investigates and A Bit of a Do.

Glenister's sons, Robert Glenister (born 1960) and Philip Glenister (born 1963), became successful actors.

External links

1932 births
Living people
British television directors
Glenister acting family